Brad John Crabtree is an American energy consultant and former politician who is the assistant secretary of energy for fossil energy in the Biden administration.

Early life and education 
Crabtree is a native of North Dakota. He earned a Bachelor of Science degree from the Walsh School of Foreign Service at Georgetown University and a Master of Arts in history from Johns Hopkins University.

Career 
From 1997 to 2001, Crabtree was a project director at the Consensus Council in Bismarck, North Dakota. He was also the director of the Carbon Capture Coalition and served as a member of the National Coal Council. Crabtree joined the Great Plains Institute as a policy director in 2002 and has worked as vice president for carbon management since 2011. He was the Democratic nominee for a seat on the North Dakota Public Service Commission in 2010, losing to Kevin Cramer.

Personal life 
Crabtree lives in Ashley, North Dakota, with his wife and daughter.

References 

Living people
North Dakota Democrats
Walsh School of Foreign Service alumni
Johns Hopkins University alumni
People from McIntosh County, North Dakota
Year of birth missing (living people)
United States Department of Energy officials
Biden administration personnel